John M. Blackburn (October 19, 1913 in Massillon, Ohio – November 15, 2006 in Newport, Oregon) was a lyricist. He wrote the lyrics to "Moonlight in Vermont".

He was raised in Shaker Heights, a suburb of Cleveland, Ohio.

He traveled with a puppet theater that brought him to Vermont, inspiring the lyrics to     "Moonlight in Vermont", the music was composed by Karl Suessdorf. It was introduced by Margaret Whiting in 1944.

In 1957, Oscar Peterson recorded Blackburn's "Susquehanna".

External links
John Blackburn from Jazz Biographies

1913 births
2006 deaths
Songwriters from Ohio
American musical theatre composers
American musical theatre lyricists
People from Massillon, Ohio
People from Newport, Oregon
Musicians from Shaker Heights, Ohio
Songwriters from Oregon
20th-century American composers
20th-century American male musicians